Caprese may refer to:

Adjective
Something of or pertaining to Capri

Places
Caprese Michelangelo, a village in Tuscany

Food
Insalata Caprese, a salad of mozzarella, tomatoes, and basil
Torta caprese, a traditional Italian chocolate, and almond or walnut, cake